Dessie Teacher's Education College is a teacher's college in Ethiopia, found in the South Wollo zone which is known as Dessie in the north of Ethiopia. It is managed by the Amhara National Regional State Education Bureau.

References

Universities and colleges in Ethiopia
Teachers colleges